Umdat as-Salik wa 'Uddat an-Nasik (Reliance of the Traveller and Tools of the Worshipper, also commonly known by its shorter title Reliance of the Traveller) is a classical manual of fiqh for the Shafi'i school of Islamic jurisprudence. The author of the main text is 14th-century scholar  Shihabuddin Abu al-'Abbas Ahmad ibn an-Naqib al-Misri (AH 702-769 / AD 1302–1367).  
Al-Misri based his work on the previous Shafi'i works of Imam Nawawi and Imam Abu Ishaq as-Shirazi, following the order of Shirazi's al-Muhadhdhab (The Rarefaction) and the conclusions of Nawawi's Minhaj at-Talibin (The Seeker's Road).

Keller translation

Umdat as-Salik was translated into English by the American Muslim scholar Nuh Ha Mim Keller in 1991 and became the first translation of a standard Islamic legal reference in a European language to be certified by Al-Azhar. The translation comprises 26 sections titled according to the letters of the English alphabet, Book A, Book B, Book C, etc.

Books A through C contain introductory material forming a guide to fiqh compiled by Keller. Books D through O correspond to the original work of al-Misri, commencing with an "Author's Introduction". Following are translations of eight shorter works - Books P through V - which address topics such as personal ethics, character, and traditional Islamic Sufism, and include famous classical texts such as Al-Ghazzali's Ihya’ ʿulum al-din and  Nawawi's Riyadh as-Saaliheen. Book W consists of extensive notes and appendices, Book X offers thumbnail biographies of hundreds of figures mentioned throughout the work, and Books Y and Z conclude it with a bibliography and indexes.

Certain sections of the book were left untranslated (although the original Arabic text is retained), as Keller considered them irrelevant to modern societies. These parts include a section on slavery, describing the rights and duties of slaves and their masters, as well as some smaller sections such as, for example, a discussion on fixing utensils using gold.

Main sections of the Keller translation

A. Sacred Knowledge (pg. 1)
B. The Validity of Following Qualified Scholarship (pg. 15)
C. The Nature of Legal Rulings (pg. 27)
D. Author's Introduction to 'Umdat al-Salik (pg. 47)
E. Purification (pg. 49)
F. The Prayer (pg. 101)
G. The Funeral Prayer (pg. 220)
H. Zakat (pg. 244)
I. Fasting (pg. 277)
J. The Pilgrimage (pg. 297)
K. Trade (pg. 371)
L. Inheritance (pg. 460)
M. Marriage (pg. 506)
N. Divorce (pg. 554)
O. Justice (pg. 578)
P. Enormities (pg. 649)
Q. Commanding the Right and Forbidding the Wrong (pg. 713)
R. Holding One's Tongue (pg. 726)
S. Delusions (pg. 777)
T. A Pure Heart (pg. 796)
U. The Gabriel Hadith (pg. 807)
V. Belief in Allah and His Messenger (pg. 816)
W. Notes and Appendices (pg. 826)
X. Biographical Notes (pg. 1019)
Y. Works Cited (pg. 1116)
Z. Indexes (pg. 1128)

See also

List of Sunni books

References

Sunni fiqh
Sunni literature
14th-century jurists